The IBM 1013 Card Transmission Terminal was a device manufactured by IBM from 1961 which transmitted the data held on 80-column cards to a remote computer or another 1013.
  
The speed was generally considered 100 cards per minute but could be faster if programmed to send/receive only a portion of the cards if all 80 columns were not used.  It needed a full-duplex circuit to operate but at any given time could only transmit or receive.

References

External links
 "IBM 1013 Card Transmission Terminal / Communicating Reader-Punch" at Computer History Museum

1013
1013